Pseudomorphine (also known as oxydimorphine or dehydromorphine) is an inactive, natural dimerisation product of the morphine molecule in tandem and thus a common impurity in morphine concentrations. It was first described by Pelletier in 1835.

This compound may be synthesized by the oxidative coupling of morphine by potassium ferricyanide.

Pseudomorphine contributes very little to morphine's effects. It produces no effects in the central nervous or gastrointestinal systems, but it might have some effects on the circulatory system.

See also
Thebaine (paramorphine)
Morphine-N-oxide
Morphine-3-glucuronide
Morphine-6-glucuronide

References

4,5-Epoxymorphinans